Graziano Mannari (born 19 April 1969 in Livorno) is a retired Italian professional footballer, who played as a forward, either as a centre-forward, or as a winger.

Career
Throughout his career, Mannari played for 3 seasons (30 games, 3 goals) in the Serie A, for A.C. Milan and Parma F.C.

His most memorable matches for Milan came on the 12 March 1989, in a 4–0 league win against Juventus F.C., in which he scored two goals, and in the club's 1988 Supercoppa Italiana victory, in which he also scored.

In 1989, he was called up to the Italy national under-21 football team, but remained on the bench for the two games he was on the roster.

Honours
Milan
 Serie A champion: 1987–88.
 Supercoppa Italiana winner: 1988.
 European Cup winner: 1988–89.

External links
 European Champions Cup/UEFA Champions League Winning Squads

References

1969 births
Living people
Italian footballers
Serie A players
Serie B players
Serie C players
A.C. Milan players
Como 1907 players
Parma Calcio 1913 players
U.S. Fiorenzuola 1922 S.S. players
A.C.N. Siena 1904 players
Pisa S.C. players
Ravenna F.C. players
U.S. Pistoiese 1921 players
U.S. Città di Pontedera players

Association football forwards